Ullo or Üllő may refer to:

 Üllő, a town near Budapest, Hungary
 Üllő5, an archaeological excavation site near the Hungarian town
 Antonio Ullo, an Italian sprinter
 Chris Ullo, American politician